Social Democratic Youth Federation (Polish: Federacja Młodych Socjaldemokratów, FMS) is the youth wing of the Democratic Left Alliance.

History 
FMS was established in 2003 from the merger of the Youth Left Alliance and the Association of the Young Democratic Left.

Aim 
As its mission statement, FMS seeks to promote among young people the ideas of equality of freedom, social justice, ecological and active lifestyle. FMS is against xenophobia, fascism, intolerance, violations of democratic principles and human rights.

References

Youth wings of political parties in Poland
Youth wings of social democratic parties